Eliogabalus is the second studio album by Italian/Slovenian rock band Devil Doll, released on May 1, 1990 on Hurdy Gurdy Records.

A concept by Mr. Doctor, the title of the album is a reference to the Roman Emperor Elagabalus.

Background
In 1989 Mr. Doctor began work on two compositions: "The Black Holes of My Mind", a 45-minute composition incorporating esoteric quotations and subliminal messages; and "Eliogabalus", a 60-minute composition inspired by Antonin Artaud's book Heliogabalus: Or, The Crowned Anarchist.

In December, Devil Doll entered Tivoli Studios with Jurij Toni to record the album. Hurdy Gurdy's budget limitations forced Mr. Doctor to cut down the two former compositions, in order to include both on a single vinyl release.

Only the Italian section, and the Slovenian guitarist Bor Zuljan, was recruited to record the album.

Eliogabalus was released in 1990, with the shortened version of "The Black Holes of My Mind" renamed "Mr. Doctor" for this release, while "Eliogabalus" retained its name.

Track listing
Lyrics by Mr. Doctor, music by Mr. Doctor and Edoardo Beato, arranged by Mr. Doctor and Devil Doll.

Personnel

Line up
Mr. Doctor – vocals, organ, celesta, accordion
Edoardo Beato – piano, keyboards
Albert Dorigo – guitar
Bor Zuljan – guitar (on "Mr. Doctor")
Rick Bosco – bass
Katia Giubbilei – violin
Roberto Dani – drums, percussion

Guests
Jurij Toni – tuba (on "Eliogabalus")
Paolo Zizich – backing vocals and duet "The Mirror" with Mr. Doctor)
The "Devil Chorus" conducted by Marian Bunic and formed by:
Marian Bunic
Breda Bunic
Polona Sever
Beti Roblek
Helena Pancur
Gregor Oblak
Jure Strencan
Borut Usenik
Valentina Blazinsek
Mr. Doctor

Devil Doll (Slovenian band) albums
1990 albums
Albums recorded in Slovenia
Cultural depictions of Elagabalus